Gortarowey Forest Recreation Area is a forest park and recreation area at the foot of Ben Bulben near Drumcliffe in County Sligo, Ireland. The park is currently managed by Coillte, Ireland's commercial forestry company, as part of the larger Benbulben Forest. The park lies adjacent to the Benbulben, Gleniff and Glenade Special Area of Conservation and is known as the only area in Ireland where chickweed willowherb (Epilobium alsinifolium) and alpine saxifrage (Micranthes nivalis) can be found.

References

Forests and woodlands of the Republic of Ireland
Geography of County Sligo
Parks in County Sligo